"Joe Bloggs", "Fred Bloggs" and "Bill Taylor" are placeholder names used primarily in the United Kingdom to represent the average man on the street. It is used by students, on standardized test preparation courses, to represent the average test-taker. Many countries, such as the United States, Germany or South Africa, use their own unique placeholder names, some even used tongue in cheek. Sometimes the name will be useful as a quick alternative, or stalling mechanism especially when used in conjunction with "What's'isname?" and "'Im down the street", when a forgotten name sits on the tip of the tongue.

Examples 
In The Princeton Review standardized test preparation courses, "Joe Bloggs" represents the average test-taker, and students are trained to identify the "Joe Bloggs answer", or the choice which seems right but may be misleading on harder questions.

"Joe Bloggs" was a brand name for a clothing range, especially baggy jeans, which was closely associated with the Madchester scene of the 1990s.

History 
The name Bloggs is believed to have been derived from the East Anglian region of Britain, Norfolk or Suffolk, deriving from bloc, a bloke. In the UK, a "bloke" represents the average man on the street.

Similar cases 
In the United Kingdom and United States, John has historically been one of the most common male first names, and Smith is the most common surname in each, so "John Smith" is a recurrent pseudonym and placeholder name in those countries (especially in legal contexts).

Other placeholders, often used in advertising store cards and credit cards, are Mr/Mrs A Smith or A. N. Other.

See also 

 List of placeholder names by language

References 

Common law
Legal fictions
Placeholder names

sv:Medelsvensson